A name in the Italian language consists of a given name, and a surname; in most contexts, the given name is written before the surname. (In official documents, the Western surname may be written before the given name or names.)

Italian names, with their fixed nome and cognome structure, have little to do with the ancient Roman naming conventions, which used a tripartite system of given name, gentile name, and hereditary or personal name (or names). 

The Italian nome is not analogous to the ancient Roman nomen; the Italian nome is the given name (distinct between siblings), while the Roman nomen is the gentile name (inherited, thus shared by all in a gens). Female naming traditions, and name-changing rules after adoption, for both sexes likewise differ between Roman antiquity and modern Italian use. Moreover, the low number, and the steady decline of importance and variety, of Roman praenomina starkly contrast with the current number of Italian given names.

In Italy, one portion in person's name may be determined by the name day. These name days are determined according to the sanctorale, a cycle found in the General Roman Calendar, which assigns to a day a saint (or as to the great majority of days, several saints), so that different names often are celebrated on that day. Traditionally, parents fix the name day of their child at christening, according to their favourite saint; in case of different ones (on different days) with the same name; that child will carry it throughout life. In the case of multiple given names, the child will celebrate only one, usually the first.

Given names
Typical Italian male given names:
 Commonly end in -o: Alberto, Alessio, Alessandro, Angelo, Anselmo, Antonio,  Basilio, Basilico, Bruno, Bernardo, Carlo, Claudio, Cristiano, Damiano, Danilo,  Dario, Domenico, Enrico, Enzo, Eugenio, Evangelo , Ezio, Fabrizio, Federico, Filippo, Flavio, Francesco, Franco, Gaetano, Gennaro, Giorgio, Giuliano, Gregorio, Lorenzo, Marco, Mario, Mariano ,Martino, Massimo, Matteo, Maurizio, Mauro, Nevio, Norberto, Orlando, Ottaviano, Paolo, Pietro, Riccardo, Roberto, Silvio,  Stefano, Tommaso, Umberto, Valentino, Vincenzo, Vittorio, etc.
 Can also end in -e: Achille, Aimone, Alceste, Alcide, Amilcare, Amintore, Annibale, Apollone, Aristotele, Ariodante, Astore, Baldassare, Beppe, Fedone, Oreste , Carmine, Cesare, Clemente, Daniele, Dante, Davide, Emanuele, Ercole, Ettore, Felice, Gabriele, Gaspare, Gastone, Gentile, Giacobbe, Giosuè, Giuseppe, Leone, Marte, Melchiorre, Michele, Nataniele, Oddone, Ottone, Pasquale, Raffaele, Salomone, Salvatore, Samuele, Sante, Scipione, Simone, Ulisse, Vitale, Vittore, etc. 
 May also end in -i: Dionigi, Gianni, Giovanni, Luigi, Nanni, Ranieri. etc.
 Or in -a: Andrea, Battista, Basilica, Elia, Enea, Evangelista, Luca, Mattia, Nicola 
 Some names, usually of foreign origin (or foreign variant of existing Italian names), end with a consonant, such as Christian/Cristian ( Cristiano), Igor, Ivan (cfr. Ivano or Giovanni), Loris, Oscar and Walter/Valter (cfr. Gualtiero).

Typical Italian female names:
 Commonly end in -a: Adriana, Angela, Anita, Anna, Arianna, Aurora, Basilica, Basilia, Basilissa, Bella, Berta, Bettina, Carla, Corinna, Cristiana, Diana, Elena, Elisa, Eugenia, Fabrizia, Federica, Francesca, Gabriella, Gianna,  Giovanna, Giuliana, Ilaria, Isabella, Lavinia, Loredana,  Lucia, Lucrezia, Luisa, Maddalena, Maria, Marianna ,Martina, Massima, Nicoletta, Olivia, Ornella, Paola, Patrizia, Piera,  Roberta,  Sara, Simona, Silvia, Sofia, Stella, Teresa, Vittoria, Viviana, Zarina, Zita, etc.
 Can also end in -e: Adelaide, Adele, Agnese, Alice, Beatrice, Berenice, Geltrude, Irene, Matilde, Rachele, Venere 
 May also end in -i: Noemi, etc.
 Or even with a consonant (usually of foreign origin), such as Nives, Lauren, Ester.

A few names end with an accented vowel, for instance Niccolò and Giosuè.

Almost every base name can have a diminutive form ending with -ino/-ina or -etto/etta as in Paolino/Paoletto and Paolina/Paoletta from Paolo and Paola, -ello/-ella, as in Donatello/Donatella from Donato and Donata, or -uccio/-uccia, as in Guiduccio from Guido. The forms -uzzo/-uzza, as in Santuzza from Santa, are typical of Sicilian language.

The most common names are:

 For males: Marco, Alessandro, Giuseppe, Flavio, Luca, Giovanni, Roberto, Andrea, Stefano, Angelo, Francesco, Mario, Luigi.
 For females: Anna, Maria, Sara, Laura, Aurora, Valentina, Giulia, Rosa, Gianna, Giuseppina, Angela, Giovanna, Sofia, Stella.
Since the ancient Romans had a very limited stock of given names (praenomina), very few modern Italian given names (nomi) are derived directly from the classical ones. A rare example would be Marco (from Marcus).

Some nomi were taken from classical clan names (nomina) for their meanings or because they are euphonic, such as Emilio/Emilia (from Aemilius), Valerio/Valeria (from Valerius), Claudio/Claudia (from Claudius), Orazio (from Horatius), Fabio (from the cognomen Fabius), Flavio/Flavia (from Flavius) and Fulvio from Fulvius.

When combined with a second given name, Giovanni and Pietro are commonly contracted to Gian- and Pier-, as in Giancarlo, Gianfranco, Gianluca, Gianluigi, Gianmaria, Giampaolo (Gianpaolo), Giampiero (Gianpiero), Giambattista, Pierangelo, Pierantonio, Pierfranco, Pierluigi, Piermaria, Pierpaolo,  and so on.

Italian unisex names are very rare (e.g. Celeste), but the feminine name Maria is common as a masculine second name, as in Gianmaria, Carlo Maria, Anton Maria etc.

Surnames
Italy has the largest collection of surnames (cognomi) of any country in the world, with over 350,000.  Men—except slaves—in ancient Rome always had hereditary surnames, i.e., nomen (clan name) and cognomen (side-clan name). However, the multi-name tradition was lost by the Middle Ages. Outside the aristocracy, where surnames were often patronymic or those of manors or fiefs, most Italians began to assume hereditary surnames around 1450.

Registration of baptisms and marriages became mandatory in parishes after the Council of Trento in 1564.

Suffixes
A large number of Italian surnames end in i due to the medieval Italian habit of identifying families by the name of the ancestors in the plural (which has an -i suffix in Italian). For instance, Filippo from the Ormanno family (gli Ormanni) would be called "Filippo degli Ormanni" ("Filippo of the Ormannos"). In time, the middle possessive portion ("of the") was dropped, but surnames became permanently pluralized even for a single person. Filippo Ormanno would therefore be known as Filippo Ormanni. Some families, however, opted to retain the possessive portion of their surnames, for instance Lorenzo de' Medici literally means "Lorenzo of the Medici" (de''' is a contraction of dei, also meaning "of the"; c.f. The Medicis).

Some common suffixes indicate endearment (which may also become pluralized and receive an -i ending), for example:
 -ello/illo/etto/ino (diminutive "little"), e.g., Bernardello, Vettorello, Iannuccillo, Bortoletto, Bernardino, Ravellino, Verdino
 -one/ne (augmentative "big"), e.g., Mangione, Bellone, Capone, Pastene, Mantone, Vallone
 -accio/azzo/asso (pejorative), e.g., Boccaccio, Terrazzo, Varasso

Other endings are characteristic of certain regions:
Veneto: -asso, -ato/ati,  and consonants (l, n, r); -on: Bissacco, Zoccarato, Cavinato, Brombal, Bordin, Meneghin, Perin, Vazzoler, Peron, Francescon, Zanon, Fanton
Sicily: -aro, -isi and "osso": Cavallaro, Cherisi, Rosi, Rosso (Sicily, Piedmont and Veneto)
Lombardy and Piedmont: -ago/ghi (of Celtic derivation), -engo/enghi (of Germanic derivation): Salmoiraghi, Ornaghi, Vernengo, Martinengo, Giordanengo, Lambertenghi
Lombardy: -ate/ati/atti: Lunati, Bonatti, Moratti, Orsatti
Piedmont: -ero, -audi, -asco,-zzi, -anti, -ini: Ferrero, Rambaudi, Comaco, Bonazzi, Santi, Baldovini 
Friuli: -otti/utti and -t: Bortolotti, Pascutti, Codutti, Rigonat, Ret
Tuscany: -ai and -aci/ecci/ucci: Bollai, Balducci, Martaci
Sardinia: -u, -as and -is, derived from the Sardinian language (see Sardinian surnames): Pusceddu, Cadeddu, Schirru, Marras, Argiolas, Floris, Melis, Abis , Cannas
Calabria: -ace: Storace, Versace
Campania: -iello: Borriello, Aiello, Manganiello
Abruzzo: -us, -is and -iis that stem from traditional Latin names: Fidelibus, De Sanctis, De Laurentiis

Origins
As in most other European naming traditions, patronymics are common. Originally they were indicated by a possessive, e.g., Francesco de Bernardo, meaning "Francis (the son) of Bernard". De Luca ("[son] of Luke") remains one of the most common Italian surnames. However, de ("of") was often dropped and suffixes added, hence de Bernardo evolved to be Bernardo and eventually pluralized as Bernardi (see Suffixes above).

The origin or residence of the family gave rise to many surnames, e.g.,
 Habitat: Della Valle ("of the valley"), Montagna ("mountain").
 Specific placename:Abbruzzesi/Abbruzzi/Abruzzi/Abruzzese/Abruzzesi/D'Abbruzzo/D'Abruzzo ("Abruzzan"/"of Abruzzo"/"from Abruzzo")Benevento/Di Benevento/Beneventano ("Beneventan"/"from Benevento")Albanese/Albanesi ("Albanian"/"from Albania")Bologna/Bologni/Bolognese/Bolognesi ("Bolognan"/"from Bologna")Bresci/(De) Brescia/Bresciani/Bresciano/Brescianini ("Brescian"/"from Brescia")Calabrese/Calabresi/Calabria ("Calabrian"/"from Calabria")Campaniano/Campano/Campana ("Campanian"/"from Campania")Casertano ("Casertanian"/"from Caserta")Catalani/Catalano ("Catalan"/"from Catalonia") Catanese/Catanesi/Catania ("Catanian"/"from Catania"/"from the province of Catania")Emiliani/Emiliano ("Emilian"/"from Emilia")Fiorentini/Fiorentino/Firenze/Florenzi ("Florentine"/"from Florence")Francese/Franzese/Franzesi ("French"/"from France")De Genova/Di Genova/Genova/Genovese/Genovesi ("Genoese"/"from Genoa")Greco ("Greek")De Lucca/Di Lucca/Lucca/Lucchesi/Lucchese ("Luccan"/"from Lucca")Maltese/Maltesi ("Maltese"/"from Malta")De Milano/Di Milano/Milano/Milanese/Milanesi ("Milanese"/"from Milan")De Napoli/Di Napoli/Napoli/Napoletani/Napoletano/Napolitani/Napolitano ("Neapolitan"/"from Naples") Di Norcia/Norcia/"from Norcia")Da Padova/Di Padova/Padova/Padovani/Padovano/Patavini/Patavino/Padovan ("Paduan"/"from Padua")(Di) Palermo/Palermitani/Palermitano ("Palermitan"/"from Palermo")De Pisa/Di Pisa/Pisa/Pisani/Pisano ("Pisan"/"from Pisa")Portoghese/Portoghesi ("Portuguese"/"from Portugal") Puglisi/Pugliese ("Apulian"/"from Apulia")Romagnoli/Romagnolo ("Romagnan"/"from Romagna")Romana/Romani/Romano ("Roman"/"from Rome") Salerno/Salernitani/Salernitano ("Salernitan"/"from Salerno")Sardo ("Sardinian"/"from Sardinia") Siciliana/Siciliani/Siciliano ("Sicilian"/"from Sicily")Spagnola/Spagnoli/Spagnolo/Spagnuola/Spagnuoli/Spagnuolo ("Spaniard", "Spanish", "from Spain")Svizzera/Svizzeri/Svizzero ("Swiss"/"from Switzerland")Tedeschi/Tedesco/Tedisco/Todeschi/Todesco ("German"/"from Germany")Toscani/Toscano ("Tuscan"/"from Tuscany")Trapanese/Trapanesi ("Trapanese"/"from Trapani"/"from the province of Trapani")Umbro ("Umbrian"/"from Umbria")Veneziani/Veneziano ("Venetian"/"from Venice")Veronese/Veronesi ("from Verona")
 Nearby landmarks: La Porta ("the gate"), Fontana ("fountain"), Torregrossa ("big tower").

Ancestors' occupation was also a great source of surnames.
 Job title: Pastore ("shepherd"), Tagliabue ("ox-cutter"), Passafiume and Passalacqua ("waterman").
 Objects (metonyms) associated with the vocation:  Zappa ("hoe", farmer), Delle Fave ("of the beans", grocer), Martelli ("hammers", carpenter), Tenaglia ("pincer", smith), Farina ("flour", baker), Garitta/Garita ("garitta di vedetta"), Forni ("ovens", cook), Ferraro ("blacksmith").

Nicknames, referring to physical attributes or mannerism, also gave rise to some family names, e.g., Rossi (from rosso "redhead"), Basso ("short"), Caporaso ("shaved or bald head"), Pappalardo ("lard-eater", an insult for someone claiming to be devout but ate meat and fatty dishes in forbidden times), and Barbagelata ("frozen beard").

A few family names are still in the original Latin, like Santorum, De Juliis and De Laurentiis, reflecting that the family name has been preserved from Medieval Latin sources as a part of their business or household documentation or church records.

Articles
The traditional rule, which is the common usage especially in Tuscany, is that in referring to people by their surnames alone, the definite article should be used (il for most parts, lo before some consonants and consonant clusters and l before vowels). Mario Russo, therefore, is called il Russo ("the Russo"). Now, some prefer to use the article only or chiefly for historical surnames ("l'Ariosto", "il Manzoni", etc.)

Male given names are never preceded by an article except in popular northern regional usage.

However, in Tuscany and the rest of Northern Italy, given names of females are usually preceded by articles (la Maria, la Gianna) unless one is speaking of a woman who is personally unknown (such as Cleopatra, Maria Stuarda, with no article). That is also the traditional grammar rule.

Articles are also used (more often than with those of men) with the surnames of women: Gianni Rossi can be called il Rossi or (especially nowadays) simply Rossi, but Maria Bianchi is usually la Bianchi (also la Maria Bianchi).

Placing the surname before the name is considered incorrect except in bureaucratic usage and is often seen as a sign of lack of education.

Names that are derived from possessions of noble families normally never had articles preceding them such as the House of Farnese (from a territorial holding) and the Cornaro family (from a prince-bishopric). Articles were omitted also for surnames with an identifiable foreign origin (including Latin ones) such as Cicerone.

That practice somewhat resembles the Greek custom of placing definite articles before all names (see Greek names). The Greco-Italian practice even spread to French in the 17th century, especially in writings regarding figures in literature and painting such as le Poussin. For example, some Italian surnames of Greek sound descent: Papasidero, Papadopulo''.

See also

Germanic names in Italy

References

 
Names by culture